Khizirpur-Alinagar is a village in Dildarnagar kamsar founded by Zamindaar Imran Khan & Zamindaar Numan Khan who came from [[Usia, Dildarnagar village of kamsar-o-bar Dildarnagar in the Indian state of Uttar Pradesh.

Histrorical Population

References 

Dildarnagar
Dildarnagar Fatehpur
Cities and towns in Ghazipur district
Towns and villages in Kamsar
Villages in Ghazipur district